This is a list of municipalities of East Timor by Human Development Index as of 2021, including the special administrative region of Oecusse.

References 

East Timor
Human Development Index
Municipalities By Human Development Index
HDI